Randall S. Knox (born August 30, 1949) is a former member of the Wisconsin State Assembly.

Biography
Knox was born on August 30, 1949 in Madison, Wisconsin. After graduating from high school in Fort Atkinson, Wisconsin, Knox received his bachelor's degree and law degrees from the University of Wisconsin-Madison. He is a lawyer and businessman. He had two children with his first wife.

Career
Knox was first elected to the Assembly in a special election on January 31, 1980. Previously, he was a member of the Fort Atkinson City Council from 1975 to 1979. He is a Republican.

References

Politicians from Madison, Wisconsin
People from Fort Atkinson, Wisconsin
Republican Party members of the Wisconsin State Assembly
Wisconsin city council members
Businesspeople from Madison, Wisconsin
Wisconsin lawyers
University of Wisconsin–Madison alumni
University of Wisconsin Law School alumni
1949 births
Living people